Hennadiy Hennadiyovych Moskal (born 11 December 1950) is a Ukrainian politician and the former governor of Zakarpattia Oblast, serving from 2015 to 2019. He was previously appointed governor of the Luhansk Oblast while the War in Donbas was ongoing in Luhansk Oblast.

Moskal also has acted as Deputy Minister of Internal Affairs of Ukraine and is a Merited Jurist of Ukraine (1997).

Biography 
Gennadiy Gennadiyovych Moskal was born on 11 December 1950 in Zadubrivka, Zastavna Raion, Chernivtsi Oblast into a family of public servants. His father, Gennady Hadeyovych Hayfulin (or Hayfullin), was an ethnic Tatar. His mother, Stepaniya Pavlivna Moskal, was an ethnic Ukrainian. Although it is uncommon, Eastern Slavic naming customs allow the mother's last name to become the last name of the child instead of the father's last name.

Education 
Gennady Moskal graduated from the Chernivtsi Railway College, then in
 1981 – Kyiv Higher School of the USSR Ministry of Internal Affairs named after Dzerzhinsky
 1984 – the Academy of Ministry of Internal Affairs of the USSR in Moscow

Career 
In 1975, Moskal started working as detective of Soviet police (Militsiya) in Chernivtsi, where he advanced from inspector to Militsiya Lieutenant General. During working in the structures of the Ministry of Internal Affairs he was the Deputy Chief of Militsiya in Chernivtsi oblast. 
 1978–1992 – Chief of criminal investigation department of Chernivtsi Oblast militsiya (with breaks)
 1983–1986 – Deputy chief of militsiya in the Lenin district of Chernivtsi
 1992–1995 – Chief of criminal militsiya in Chernivtsi Oblast
 1995–1997 – Chief of militsiya in Zakarpattia Oblast.
 1997–2000 – Deputy Minister of Internal Affairs, Chief of militsiya in Crimea
 2000–2001 – Internal Affairs, Chief of militsiya in Dnipropetrovsk region
 June 2001 – September 2002 – Governor of Zakarpattia Oblast
 2002–2005 – Chairman of State Committee on Nationalities and Migration
 February 2005 – November 2005 – Deputy Minister of Internal Affairs, Chief of criminal militsiya
 November 2005 – April 2006 – Governor of Luhansk region
 2006 – the Permanent Representative of President of Ukraine in Crimea
 9 January 2007 – appointed the Deputy Chairman of the Security Service of Ukraine (SBU) by Presidential Decree.
 April 2007 – May 2007 – Deputy Secretary of RNBU

Verkhovna Rada 
In autumn 2007, Gennady Moskal was elected People's Deputy of Ukraine from Our Ukraine–People's Self-Defense Bloc (under No. 41). In Verkhovna Rada, he performed duties of the 1st Deputy Chairman of the committee to combat organized crime and corruption.
At the time of elections in 2007, Moskal was the president of Kyiv law firm "Protection".

On 19 August 2009, Gennady Moskal was re-appointed the Chief of the Internal Affairs Department in the Autonomous Republic of Crimea, yet in order to keep the parliamentary mandate, he resigned on 15 December 2009; on 16 December 2009, he was reinstated in the former position by the government. On 3 February 2010, President Viktor Yushchenko sent an inquiry to the Constitutional Court of Ukraine on the legality of coordinating both positions by Moskal; after that, Moskal has resigned in Crimea.

Moskal joined the party Front of Changes in December 2011. In 2012 he was re-elected into parliament on the party list of Fatherland. On 15 June 2013 his Front for Change (party) merged into Fatherland. On 25 August 2014 Moskal was expelled from Fatherland because he had supported, and campaigned for, Petro Poroshenko in the 25 May 2014 Ukrainian presidential election and thus not Fatherland's presidential candidate Yulia Tymoshenko. From then until June 2019 Moskal was a member of the party Petro Poroshenko Bloc.

In the 2019 Ukrainian parliamentary election Moskal did not get elected (as an independent candidate) after losing in single-seat constituency 106 in Severodonetsk, with 11.99% of the vote.

Luhansk Oblast Governor and Governor of Zakarpattia Oblast
On 18 September 2014 President Petro Poroshenko appointed Moskal Luhansk Oblast Governor. At that time Luhansk Oblast was one of the front-lines of the War in Donbas. On 15 July 2015 he was dismissed as Governor. Moskal was appointed Governor of Zakarpattia Oblast the sam day. President Volodymyr Zelenskyy dismissed Moskal (appointed Ivan Duran as acting Governor of Zakarpattia Oblast) on 11 June 2019.

Awards 
 1997 – Honoured lawyer of Ukraine
 Honoured lawyer of AR Crimea
 Order of Merit, III and II grades
 Award "Nominal firearm"
 2002 – Winner of the All-Ukrainian program "Leaders of the Regions"

Family 
Gennady Moskal is married. He has one daughter and two grandchildren.

References

External links 
 Personal website of Hennadiy Moskal
 Hennadiy Moskal biography at Liga.net
 Hennady Moskal profile at Verkhovna Rada official portal

1950 births
Living people
People from Chernivtsi Oblast
Chevaliers of the Order of Merit (Ukraine)
Ukrainian police officers
Governors of Zakarpattia Oblast
Governors of Luhansk Oblast
Presidential representatives of Ukraine in Crimea
Sixth convocation members of the Verkhovna Rada
Seventh convocation members of the Verkhovna Rada
Front for Change (Ukraine) politicians
Independent politicians in Ukraine
People of the Euromaidan
Lieutenant generals of Ukraine
Pro-Ukrainian people of the war in Donbas
21st-century Ukrainian politicians
Ukrainian people of Tatar descent
Recipients of the Honorary Diploma of the Cabinet of Ministers of Ukraine